Blakeman is an unincorporated community in Rawlins County, Kansas, United States.  It is located west of Atwood.

History
A post office was opened in Blakeman in 1887, and remained in operation until it was discontinued in 1952.

Education
The community is served by Rawlins County USD 105 public school district.

References

Further reading

External links
 Rawlins County maps: Current, Historic, KDOT

Unincorporated communities in Rawlins County, Kansas
Unincorporated communities in Kansas
1887 establishments in Kansas
Populated places established in 1887